Celso Santiago de Souza, known as Zinho (born 5 July 1962), is a Brazilian football coach and a former player.

He played 8 seasons and 178 games in the Primeira Liga for Braga, Sporting, Sporting Espinho and Penafiel.

Club career
He made his Primeira Liga debut for Braga on 17 April 1983 as a late substitute in a 1–3 loss to Boavista.

He scored three goals for Sporting in their first-round 1986–87 UEFA Cup matchup against ÍA.

References

External links

1962 births
Footballers from Rio de Janeiro (city)
Living people
Brazilian footballers
CR Vasco da Gama players
S.C. Braga players
Brazilian expatriate footballers
Expatriate footballers in Portugal
Primeira Liga players
Sporting CP footballers
F.C. Penafiel players
Racing de Santander players
Expatriate footballers in Spain
Segunda División players
S.C. Espinho players
Brazilian football managers
Brazilian expatriate football managers
Expatriate football managers in Portugal
Primeira Liga managers
Association football midfielders